Garragan is a 1924 German silent film directed by Ludwig Wolff and starring Edward Burns, Carmel Myers and Julanne Johnston.

The film's sets were designed by the art director Heinrich Beisenherz.

Cast
 Edward Burns
 Carmel Myers
 Julanne Johnston
 Owen Gorin
 Kurt von Lessen
 Adolf Bassermann
 Karl Platen
 Eduard von Winterstein
 Eduard Rothauser
 Max Maximilian
 Heinrich Peer
 Fritz Russ
 Hans Wassmann

References

Bibliography
 Bock, Hans-Michael & Bergfelder, Tim. The Concise CineGraph. Encyclopedia of German Cinema. Berghahn Books, 2009.

External links

1924 films
Films of the Weimar Republic
German silent feature films
Films directed by Ludwig Wolff
German black-and-white films
1920s German films